This is a chronological list of films produced in the Ivory Coast.

1960s
Korogo (1964)
Concerto pour un exil (1969), directed by Desiré Ecaré
Mouna ou le rêve d'un artiste (1969)
Woman with the Knife (La Femme au Couteau; 1969), directed by Timité Bassori

1970s
It's Up to Us, France (À nous deux, France; 1970), directed by Desiré Ecaré
Abusuan (1972)
Amanie (1972)
Chapeau, Le (1975)
Noirs et blancs en couleur (1976)
Herbe sauvage, L (1977)

1980s
Adja Tio: À cause de l'héritage (1981)
Djeli, conte d'aujourd'hui (1981)
Dalokan (1983)
Petanqui (1983)
Comédie exotique (1984)
Ablakon (1985)
Faces of Women (Visages de femmes; 1985), directed by Desiré Ecaré
J'ai choisi de vivre (1987)
Regard de fous (1987)
Vie platinée, La (1987)
Ada dans la jungle (1988)
Bal poussière (1988)
Bouka (1988)
Dancing in the Dust (1988)
Guérisseurs, Les (1988)

1990s
Sixième doigt, Le (1990)
Au nom du Christ (1993)
Rue princesse (1994)
Wariko, le gros lot (1994)
Noirs dans les camps nazis (1995)
Bouzie (1997)
Lunettes noires (1998)
Nadro (1998)
Woubi Cheri (1998)
Jumelle, La (1999)
Ngolo di papa (1999)
Trois fables à l'usage des blancs en Afrique (1999)

2000s
Adanggaman (2000)
Djaatala (2002)
Roues libres (2002)
Pari de l'amour, Le (2003)
Caramel (2004)
Invités surprises (2008)

2010s
Run (2014)

2020s
Night of the Kings (La Nuit des rois) - 2020

External links
Ivorian films at the Internet Movie Database

Ivory Coast
Ivorian films
Films